Natronolimnohabitans is a genus of the Natrialbaceae. It has also been proposed that Haloterrigena turkmenica be considered a part of these genus.

Taxonomy
The type species of Natronolimnohabitans, N. innermongolicus, was originally described as one of two original members in the genus Natronolimnobius.

References

Archaea genera
Taxa described in 2020
Euryarchaeota